Dyé is a commune in the Yonne department in Bourgogne-Franche-Comté in north-central France. It had a population of 214 in 2019.

See also
Communes of the Yonne department

References

Communes of Yonne